Miklušovce is a village and municipality in Prešov District in the Prešov Region of eastern Slovakia.

History
In historical records the village was first mentioned in 1330.

Geography
The municipality lies at an altitude of 481 metres and covers an area of 7.22 km². It has a population of about 340 people.

References

External links
 
 

Villages and municipalities in Prešov District
Šariš